Qelichabad (also Romanized as Qelīchābād; also known as Shahīd Honarmand and Shahīd Moḩammad Honarmand) is a village in Zavin Rural District, Zavin District, Kalat County, Razavi Khorasan Province, Iran. At the 2006 census, its population was 1,088, in 285 families.

References 

Populated places in Kalat County